Anton or Antón is a surname. Notable people with the surname include:

Abel Antón (born 1962), Spanish long-distance runner
Adina Anton (born 1984), Romanian long jumper
Anton Anton (born 1949), Romanian engineer and politician
Arsenio Martínez-Campos y Antón (1831–1900), Spanish soldier and politician who restored the Bourbon dynasty
Carl Anton (1722–?), Curonian writer
Christopher Anton, American singer and songwriter
Craig Anton (born 1962), American actor and comedian
Fred Anton (born 1934), American businessman and political figure
Gabriel Anton (1858–1933), Austrian neurologist and psychiatrist
Hermann Eduard Anton (1794–1872), German malacologist
Igor Antón (born 1983), Basque road race bicyclist
Karl Anton (1898–1979), German film director, screenwriter and producer
Paul Anton (born 1991), Romanian footballer
Susan Anton (born 1950), American actress and singer
Tõnu Anton (born 1953), Estonian politician
Uno Anton (1942–2012), Estonian politician

See also

Antona (name)
Antono (name)
Antos (name)
Antoun
Kareen Antonn

References

Romanian-language surnames